Saint-Geniès-de-Fontedit is a commune in the Hérault department in the Occitanie region in southern France.

Population

Images

International relations
The commune is twinned with:
 Albudeite, Spain

See also
Communes of the Hérault department

References

Communes of Hérault